Roberto Yu Uy, also known as Berto Uy (born December 28, 1951) is a Chinese Filipino businessman and politician from the province of Zamboanga del Norte in the Philippines. He previously served as a Governor of Zamboanga del Norte.

Early life and career
Uy was born on December 28, 1951, in Mapang, Rizal, Zamboanga del Norte. He is the fifth of seven siblings of parents Isaias Uy and Francisca Yu. His parents are businesspeople who would pave the way in boosting Dipolog's local business scene. He took up his elementary education at Dipolog Chinese School (now Dipolog Community School), then he took up his secondary studies at Chiang Kai Shek College in Manila. He took up a Bachelor of Science in Mechanical Engineering at Adamson University.

Prior to politics, he worked with his father in managing their family businesses, which include a hotel and pension house, a fast food restaurant, a hardware store, and sale of copra.

Political career
For an unspecified period prior to his election as city mayor, Uy served as Officer in Charge-Barangay Captain of Barangay Central, an urban barangay of the city.

Mayor of Dipolog
Uy started his political career when he was elected and sworn as City Mayor of Dipolog from 1998 to 2007. As he is term-limited and barred from running for a fourth term, Uy ran for Governor of Zamboanga del Norte in 2007 but was defeated by then-Governor Rolando E. Yebes. Uy briefly retired from politics and return to his business endeavors.

Governor of Zamboanga del Norte
In 2013, Uy made his return to politics after he was elected and sworn in as Governor of Zamboanga del Norte in 2013, defeating 3rd legislative district Representative Cesar Jalosjos, and in 2016 against former Governor Yebes.

In 2019, another candidate for governor was running under the name "Roberto Escobido Uy", which is similar to Uy's name and uses the same nickname. The Commission on Elections declared the candidacy of "Roberto Escobido Uy" as nuisance, making the incumbent governor the legitimate candidate to participate. This decision would then be rendered as valid by the Supreme Court of the Philippines months after the election. Uy won the 2019 election against 1st legislative district Representative Bullet Jalosjos and "Escobido Uy," securing a third and final term in office.

Controversies
In 2016, Uy and two other provincial officials were being sued by the City Government of Dapitan over the alleged illegal extraction or quarrying of sand and gravel in Dapitan's remote Barangay Aseniero, conducted by the Provincial Engineering Office since 2014.

Suspension
Sometime after being reelected in the 2016 local election, Uy was suspended by the Office of the Ombudsman for three (3) months for simple misconduct. The Ombudsman found Uy guilty of simple misconduct for the termination of 6 Provincial Government employees, hired under the administration of former Governor Rolando Yebes, since assuming office in 2013.

Illegal drug connections
In a privilege speech made in the House of Representatives on September 21, 2016, Rep. Seth Frederick "Bullet" Jalosjos of Zamboanga del Norte's 1st District linked Uy and the police to the drug trade in the province. Uy, who at the time was facing suspension for simple misconduct by the Ombudsman, denied the claims made, and challenged Jalosjos to a debate which led to a congressional hearing right after.

Electoral history

Personal life
He is married to Evelyn Tang Uy who also served as mayor of Dipolog (2007–2016), and had 7 children together, including Roberto Jr. or Pin-Pin who was mayor of Municipality of Polanco (2013–2016), and Darel Dexter who is mayor of Dipolog (2016–present). He was a businessman working with his father's business prior to joining politics. His business portfolio includes hotel and sale of copra.

References

External links
Province of Zamboanga del Norte Official Website

1952 births
Living people
PDP–Laban politicians
People from Dipolog
Governors of Zamboanga del Norte
Mayors of places in Zamboanga del Norte
Politicians from Zamboanga del Norte